Menegites is a genus of moth in the family Erebidae from the Afrotropics.

Species
 Menegites nivea Kiriakoff, 1954
 Menegites sulphurea (Bartel, 1903)

References
 , 2009: Reviewing the African tiger-moth genera: 1. A new genus, two new subgenera and a species list from the expedition to Malawi by V.Kovtunovich & P. Usthjuzhanin in 2008-2009, with further taxonomic notes on South African Arctiinae (Lepidoptera, Arctiidae: Arctiinae). Atalanta 40 (1/2): 285-301, 352-355 (colour plates 24-27).
Natural History Museum Lepidoptera generic names catalog

Spilosomina
Moth genera